Interstate 695 may refer to:
Interstate 695 (District of Columbia), a partially built connector in Washington, D.C.
Interstate 695 (Maryland), a beltway around Baltimore, Maryland
Interstate 695 (New York), a short connector in Bronx County, New York
Interstate 695 (Pennsylvania), a never-built connector in Philadelphia, Pennsylvania
Interstate 695 (New Jersey), a never-built connector near Bound Brook, New Jersey
Interstate 695 (Massachusetts), a mostly never-built connector in Boston, Massachusetts

95-6
6